The Malian Cricket Federation (FeMaCrik) became an associate member of the International Cricket Council in 2017.

The Malian Cricket Federation was co-founded by Mr Kawory Berthe, a Malian English-teacher and Dr Phil Watson from Wales, in 2003. The first-ever cricket tournament in Mali was held in 2003 between different classes at Kalanso school, where Kawory Berthe was the English teacher and Phil Watson's children were enrolled. After three years of growing the game, the remodeled FeMaCrick became Mali's 25th officially recognised sports federation.

In May 2007, Mali sent an adult, men's team to participate in the inaugural North & West African Championship in Banjul, Gambia. Their international debut was against the host team (Gambia) which they lost.

The first national championships were held in 2008. University-level cricket was started in 2014. As of 2019, there are 19 teams competing in the regional tournament. Five of those are women's teams— three high school and two primary school teams.

See also
 Mali national cricket team
 Mali women's national cricket team

References

External links
 Official website
 Facebook
 Mali - ICC website

Mali
Sports governing bodies in Mali